Fabio Caracciolo (born 6 September 1984) is a Belgian former footballer.

Caracciolo made his debut in professional football for Dutch Eerste Divisie side MVV in 2001. In the winter of 2007, he was transferred to the Belgian club KVSK United, but half a year later, at the start of the 2007–08 Eerste Divisie season, Caracciolo moved to FC Eindhoven. He scored 17 goals in 36 matches, earning him a transfer to newly promoted Eredivisie side ADO Den Haag.

Statistics 

Last update: 27 December 2008

References
VI Profile

1984 births
Living people
Belgian footballers
Association football forwards
MVV Maastricht players
FC Eindhoven players
FC Den Bosch players
ADO Den Haag players
Fortuna Sittard players
C.S. Visé players
EHC Hoensbroek players
Eredivisie players
Eerste Divisie players
Challenger Pro League players
Belgian expatriate footballers
Expatriate footballers in the Netherlands
Belgian expatriate sportspeople in the Netherlands
Sportspeople from Genk
Footballers from Limburg (Belgium)
Belgian people of Italian descent